Sandnessjøen Church is a parish church of the Church of Norway in Alstahaug Municipality in Nordland county, Norway. It is located in the town of Sandnessjøen. It is the church for the Sandnessjøen parish which is part of the Nord-Helgeland prosti (deanery) in the Diocese of Sør-Hålogaland. The white, wooden church was built in a cruciform style in 1881 by the architect Andreas Grenstad. The church seats about 380 people.

History
The earliest existing historical records of the church date back to the year 1240 when the church was mentioned in the book Hákonar saga Hákonarsonar. In 1644, the old church was torn down and a new church was built on the same site. The new church was a timber-framed cruciform building with an entry porch on the west end and a small sacristy on the east end.

So in 1768, a new cruciform church was completed at Stamnæs and the old church in Sandnæs was torn down. In 1774, there was a fire in the church that caused some damages and needed to be repaired.

In 1882, the old church was torn down and replaced with a new church on the same site. Some of the materials from the old church were reused in the construction of the new building. The church was consecrated on 31 July 1882 by the bishop Jacob Sverdrup Smitt.

Media gallery

See also
List of churches in Sør-Hålogaland

References

Alstahaug
Churches in Nordland
Wooden churches in Norway
Cruciform churches in Norway
19th-century Church of Norway church buildings
Churches completed in 1882
12th-century establishments in Norway